Jon Ayres Cisky (born September 6, 1941) is an American former politician in the state of Michigan.

A native of Saginaw, Michigan, Cisky was a professor at Saginaw Valley State University in the Department of Criminal Justice. Cisky is also a former sergeant in the St. Clair County Sheriff Department. In 1984, Cisky founded Crime Stoppers for the State of Michigan. He served in the Michigan State Senate from 1991 to 1998, serving districts 14 and 33 as a Republican. In 2006, he was granted professor emeritus status at SVSU. He is married with two children.

References

1941 births
Living people
Republican Party Michigan state senators
Saginaw Valley State University faculty
20th-century American politicians